Léandre Bouchard (born October 20, 1992 in Alma, Quebec) is a Canadian cross-country mountain biker.

Career 
Bouchard competed in the U23 category until 2014, finishing 8th at the U23 World Championships. In 2015 he started competing as a full elite rider. In 2016, he was named to Canada's Olympic team.

Results

References

External links
 website

1992 births
French Quebecers
Living people
Canadian mountain bikers
People from Alma, Quebec
Sportspeople from Quebec
Olympic cyclists of Canada
Cyclists at the 2016 Summer Olympics
Cyclists at the 2018 Commonwealth Games
Commonwealth Games competitors for Canada